Alberts Riekstiņš (30 January 1907 – 8 December 2004) was a Latvian cross-country skier. He competed in the men's 18 kilometre event at the 1936 Winter Olympics.

References

1907 births
2004 deaths
Latvian male cross-country skiers
Olympic cross-country skiers of Latvia
Cross-country skiers at the 1936 Winter Olympics
Sportspeople from Riga